Simhaadri is a 2003 Indian Telugu-language action film directed by S. S. Rajamouli from a story written by V. Vijayendra Prasad. The film stars N. T. Rama Rao Jr., Bhumika Chawla, and Ankitha, with Mukesh Rishi, Nassar, and Rahul Dev playing supporting roles. The film has music composed by M. M. Keeravani while the cinematography and editing are done by Ravindra Babu and Kotagiri Venkateswara Rao respectively.

Released on 9 July 2003, the film was an industry hit . The film was subsequently remade in Tamil as Gajendra (2004), in Kannada as Kanteerava (2012) and in Bangladesh Bengali as Durdorsho (2005).

Plot 
An orphan and good-hearted lad Simhadri, grows up under Ram Bhupal Varma's family care in Visakhapatnam. The bond they share is like that of a father and son. Kasturi is Varma's granddaughter, and she is in love with Simhadri. Once a week, Simhadri visits a mentally challenged girl called Indu, and entertains her, where he provides money to her caretakers. When Varma and his wife discover Kasturi's wish to marry Simhadri, where they decides to get them married. He makes a formal announcement to officially adopt Simhadri. At this time, it is revealed that Simhadri is very close to Indu, where the alliance breaks off when Simhadri refuses to leave Indu (who is suspected to be his mistress). 

Meanwhile, two separate groups are in search of Simhadri. They find him at the banks of Godavari river, along with Indu. In the ensuing confrontation between one group of gangsters and Simhadri, Varma and his family are surprised to see that Simhadri, who used to be calm and composed, is ruthlessly killing many goons without mercy. Meanwhile, Indu gets injured, where Simhadri is helped by the second group, who call him Singhamalai Anna. When Indu regains her senses, she remembers her past and stabs Simhadri with an iron pole. Simhadri is hospitalized in critical condition, where the leader of the second group, who was searching for Simhadri, explains Simhadri's past.

Past: Varma's oldest daughter Saraswati elopes with her lover, a Keralite named Aravind. After some harsh words and saddened over Varma's rejection over her choice to marry her love, they both settle in Kerala. Learning of the sadness surrounding Varma and his wife, Simhadri takes up the job of uniting the family and visits Thiruvananthapuram, where he joins the medical and spiritual therapy spa operated by Saraswati and her family under the disguise of a patient. He finds that Indu is Varma's first granddaughter, and convinces the separated family to reunite and ask for forgiveness. During this time, Saraswati is killed by a local goon Bala Nair for witnessing a homicide done by the latter. A gangster named Bhai Saab controls the mafia of Kerala. 

Bala and Bhai belong to the same syndicate. Simhadri takes the law into his hands and eradicates Bala and his small gang in Kerala. The local Kerala people start calling him Singhamalai Anna. In the ensuing scenes, Simhadri finds himself developing into Singhamalai, eradicating Bhai Saab's network and illegal activities. Indu finds herself alone and constantly worrying about him. She proposes to her father that they should return to Andhra Pradesh because she cannot stand their home without her mother, and Simhadri ignores her now. Indu and Aravind decide to return to Visakhapatnam, where Simhadri receives a call that Indu's father is carrying a bomb in his briefcase. 

Aravind is seen rushing to catch a moving train, and Indu was about to lend him a hand. Unable to warn him, Simhadri has two choices: to let Indu's father die so people on the train can live, or let the bomb kill everyone on board, including Indu and her father. Simhadri chooses the first option. As soon as Aravind catches the train bar handle, Simhadri shoots him. Surprised at Simhadri's action, Indu jumps off the train to catch her falling father, and she gets hit her head against a pole, causing her amnesia and becoming mentally challenged. 

Present: At the hospital, Bhai and his men arrive at the hospital to finish off Simhadri, but Simhadri has gained consciousness, and with the help of his friends, cops and family (now reunited, including Indu, who apologize for her actions), he takes down Bhai and his henchmen.

Cast 

 Jr. NTR as Simhaadri / Singhamalai
 Bhumika Chawla as Indira "Indu"
 Ankitha Jhaveri as Kasturi
 Mukesh Rishi as Bhai Saab
 Nassar as Ram Bhupal Varma
 Rahul Dev as Bala Nair
 Brahmanandam as Talupulu
 Sharat Saxena as ACP Namboothri, Simhadri's mentor
 Sangeeta as Varma's wife
 Bhanu Chander as Aravind
 Seetha as Saraswathi
 Rallapalli as Indu's caretaker
 Sekhar as Bala's aide
 Ragini as Indu's caretaker
 Venu Madhav as Iyer
 Ajay
 Kota Srinivasa Rao
 Chalapathi Rao
 Sivannarayana Naripeddi
 Srinivasa Reddy as Thief
 Hema
 Ravi Babu
 G. V. Sudhakar Naidu
 Master Mahendra
 Sameer as Doctor
 Rajan P. Dev as Kerala Chief Minister (cameo appearance)
 Ramya Krishnan as Item number in the song "Chinnadamme Cheekulu"

Production
After the success of Student No.1 (2001), Rajamouli was initially supposed to direct a fantasy film with Kovelamudi Surya Prakash however the project was shelved due to high budget and lead actor's debut film Neetho (2002) became a failure. Rajamouli narrated the subject of Simhadri to VMC Combines who agreed to produce the film. The film was supposed to be made with the pair of B. Gopal and Balakrishna, which was dropped.

Writer V. Vijayendra Prasad stated that he got the idea to write the story of this film while watching Vasantha kokila (1982).

Music

Soundtrack was composed by M. M. Keeravani. He revealed that Rajamouli mostly selected tunes which are already used or those rejected by other directors. The song "Ammaina Nannaina" was originally used for the film Kishkinda Kanda (1994) and the song "Chinnadamme" for the film Samarpana (1992). "Singhamalai" was used for the film People's Encounter (1991). Keeravani acknowledged that the tune of "Chiraaku Anuko" was inspired by Cotton Eye Joe.

Release

Distribution
Simhadri distribution rights were sold for  crore. It was made with a budget of  crore of production cost.

Reception

Box office
Simhadri had a theatrical run of over 100 days.

Critical response
Jeevi of Idlebrain gave a positive review for the film, citing that the story is "pretty strong" and praised N. T. Rama Rao Jr.'s performance stating that the "character offered him the chance to use all his histrionic capability to impress the crowds and he utilized every frame of it to make a deep impact on the hearts of the viewers".

Remakes
After the success, the film was subsequently remade in Tamil as Gajendra (2004) with Vijayakanth by Suresh Krissna. The film was also remade in Kannada as Kanteerava (2012) with Duniya Vijay.The film was also remade in Bangladesh as Durdorsho (2005) with Shakib Khan.

Notes

References

External links
 

2003 films
Films scored by M. M. Keeravani
Films directed by S. S. Rajamouli
Telugu films remade in other languages
Films shot in Kerala
Films shot in Thiruvananthapuram
Indian action thriller films
2000s Telugu-language films
Films shot in Visakhapatnam
2000s masala films
2003 action thriller films